Salavat-sovkhoz (Salawat sovxozı) is a rural locality (a khutor) in Burangulovsky Selsoviet, Abzelilovsky District, Bashkortostan, Russia. The population was 1 as of 2010. There is 1 street.

Geography 
Salavat-sovkhoz is located 85 km north of Askarovo (the district's administrative centre) by road. Mukhametovo is the nearest rural locality.

References 

Rural localities in Abzelilovsky District